Early general elections were held in Greenland on 28 November 2014. They were called after Prime Minister Aleqa Hammond resigned following a spending scandal. Siumut and Inuit Ataqatigiit emerged as the largest parties both winning 11 of the 31 seats. A three party coalition government was formed consisting of the incumbent Siumut and Solidarity parties alongside the Democrats.

Electoral system
The 31 members of Parliament were elected by proportional representation in multi-member constituencies. Seats were allocated using the d'Hondt method.

Results

References

Greenland
Elections in Greenland
2014 in Greenland
November 2014 events in North America